Luo Jye (1925 – 15 March 2019) was a Taiwanese billionaire, founder of Cheng Shin Rubber, the world's ninth largest tire manufacturer. At the time of his death, he was the sixth richest person in Taiwan.

Early life
Luo Jye was born in 1925.

Career
Luo founded Cheng Shin Rubber in 1967. In January 2015, he passed control of Cheng Shin to his son, Lo Tsai-jen.

According to Forbes, Luo had a net worth of US$4.2 billion, as of January 2015.

Personal life
Luo had four children and lived in Dacun, Changhua, Taiwan.

Luo died on 15 March 2019, at the age of 94.

References 

1925 births
2019 deaths
21st-century Taiwanese businesspeople
Taiwanese billionaires
People from Changhua County
20th-century Taiwanese businesspeople